The Gospel According to the Meninblack (or sometimes referred to as just The Meninblack) is the fifth album by English rock band the Stranglers, an esoteric concept album released in 1981 on the Liberty label.  The album deals with conspiratorial ideas surrounding alien visitations to Earth, the sinister governmental men in black, and the involvement of these elements in well-known biblical narratives. This was not the first time the Stranglers had used this concept; "Meninblack" on the earlier The Raven album and subsequent 1980 single-release "Who Wants the World?" had also explored it.

History 
The album is an elaboration of concepts first introduced by the band on the aforementioned track from their preceding album, The Raven. Hugh Cornwell, former singer-songwriter and guitarist with the group, has stated his belief that the album is the pinnacle of the Stranglers' artistic and creative output, and he cites it as his favourite album by the band.  In a 2022 interview promoting his sole release Moments of Madness Cornwell reiterated this position saying "I think that we were all at the top of our game when we made ‘Men in Black’ and it comes through." The Stranglers' bassist, Jean-Jacques Burnel, shares this opinion, stating in a 2014 interview "It was a bit of a low point when The Meninblack came out and it wasn’t regarded as the masterpiece that I thought it was." Burnel regards the album as often techno in essence, though The Meninblack predates the emergence of that genre by some years.

The single releases from the album were "Thrown Away", which reached UK chart position 42 and "Just Like Nothing on Earth", their first single to miss the top 50.

The opening instrumental "Waltzinblack" was originally intended to be the second single release from the album, but was withdrawn by Liberty, which deemed it "unrepresentative". It was later used as the theme music for Keith Floyd's BBC TV series. The band developed a tradition of using the track to open their live performances.

The album initially sold around 50,000 copies, their worst-selling UK album to date, peaking at number eight on the UK Albums Chart; it spent five weeks in the listings. 

In a 2015 interview on British TV, Burnel stated that the band experimented with heroin  to help their creative process, and this album was the result.

Track listing
All tracks written and arranged by the Stranglers.

2018 expanded vinyl edition 
Self-released by the Stranglers, The Gospel According to the Meninblack received a deluxe vinyl reissue in 2018, limited to 1000 numbered copies. The original 10-track album is coupled with a bonus 12-track album, entitled The Meninblack - Revelations, which features non-album singles, associated B-sides, demos, alternate versions, live tracks, and the brass band reworking "Marchinblack".

Side one and two as per original vinyl edition
Themeninblack - Revelations

Personnel
Credits adapted from the album liner notes, except where noted.
The Stranglers
 Hugh Cornwell ("Hughinblack") – guitar, vocals, concept
 Dave Greenfield ("Daveinblack") – keyboards, vocals
 Jean-Jacques Burnel ("JJinblack") – bass, vocals
 Jet Black ("Jetinblack") – drums, vocals, percussion
Technical
 The Stranglers - producer
 Steve Churchyard – engineer, mixing
 Alan Winstanley – engineer ("Waiting for the Meninblack" and "Two Sunspots") 
 Aldo Bocca – engineer ("Just Like Nothing on Earth" and "Turn the Centuries, Turn")
 Laurence Diana – engineer ("Waltzinblack" and "Four Horsemen")
 Leonardo da Vinci – original gatefold sleeve painting
 John Pasche – art direction, design
 Jim Gibson – calligraphy
Bonus tracks
 Baz Warne - guitar, vocals (2014 and 2018 live tracks)
 Jim Macaulay - drums (2014 and 2018 live tracks)
 The Stranglers - producer (all tracks, except 2014 and 2018 live tracks and "Marchinblack")
 Alan Winstanley – producer ("Bear Cage" and "The Meninblack (Waiting for 'Em)"), engineer ("Bear Cage")                                            
 Gary Edwards – engineer ("Who Wants the World")
 Laurence Diana – engineer ("Who Wants the World")
 Steve Churchyard – producer ("G.m.B.H"), engineer ("Top Secret", "Maninwhite", "Vietnamerica", "G.m.B.H", "The Meninblack (Waiting for 'Em)", "Bear Cage")
 Louie Nicastro – producer, mixing (2014 and 2018 live tracks and "Marchinblack")

Notes

References

External links
 Online magazine devoted to The Stranglers' fifth album: JJ Burnel and Hugh Cornwell interviewed, along with producers, engineers and management

1981 albums
The Stranglers albums
Concept albums